Lisvane and Thornhill railway station is a railway station serving the Lisvane and Thornhill areas of north Cardiff, Wales. It is a stop on the Rhymney Line of the Valley Lines network.

The station is the replacement for the Cefn Onn Halt railway station, which was closed in 1986.

Services
The frequency drops to half-hourly in the evening and to two-hourly on Sundays.

Journey times are approximately:

 10 minutes to 
 15 minutes to 
 33 minutes to 
  4 minutes to 
 17 minutes to 
 28 minutes to 
 46 minutes to 

Services are operated by  Class 150 'Sprinter' units.

History
The station was officially opened on 4 November 1985 by the Chairman of South Glamorgan County Council, County Councillor Kenneth Hutchings. It was constructed at a cost of £182,000, jointly financed by South Glamorgan County Council and British Rail, with the help of a grant from the European Regional Development Fund. The station, which is situated on the northern outskirts of Cardiff,  from Queen Street, was hoped to generate at least 900 passenger journeys per day, both inbound and outbound. An 80-space County Council park-and-ride car park was constructed alongside the station.

See also 
List of railway stations in Cardiff
Rail transport in Cardiff

References

External links 

Railway stations in Cardiff
DfT Category F2 stations
Railway stations opened by British Rail
Railway stations in Great Britain opened in 1985
Railway stations served by Transport for Wales Rail